Petra Maria De Steur, also known as La Sakhra (born 20 June 1972 in Ghent) is a Belgian singer who has taken part in several Belgian National Finals for the Eurovision Song Contest:

 1993.- Ga door (Go on) (10th)
 1999.- Diep in mijn huid (Deep in my skin) (6th)
 2000.- Rêve (Dream) As a backing singer of Gerlando (9th)
 2006.- Wonderland As La Sakhra (2nd)
 2014.- "Killer Touch" (4th in semi-final 1)

References

External links

1972 births
Living people
People from East Flanders
21st-century Belgian women singers
21st-century Belgian singers